Pavuluri (పావులూరి)  is a family name. People with this surname hail from the village called Pavuluru Andhra Pradesh, India.

Notable people

 Pavuluri Mallana, an Indian mathematician of the 11th or early 12th century CE from present day Andhra Pradesh

See also
Sri Pavuluri Subbarao Public School, a private co-educational English school in Narasaraopet, Andhra Pradesh, India

Indian surnames